Lycée Privé La Clairefontaine, also known as the Collège La Clairefontaine or the École La Clairefontaine, is a private French international school, serving preschool through senior high school, with campuses in the Antananarivo area and in Tôlanaro (Fort-Dauphin) in Madagascar.

The main campus serves until senior high school,  the Fort Dauphin campus only goes to junior high.

The school has multiple campuses in the Antananarivo: primary schools in Ivandry, Mandrosoa, and Talatamaty, junior highs in Ambodivoanjo and Antsahabe, and a senior high in Ambodivoanjo. The school also has an annex in Tôlanaro which served junior and senior high school.

History
Madame Gabrielle Radavidra established the school, which opened in 1982 with a campus in Ivandry. The AEFE began recognising the school in 1994.

The Fort-Dauphin annex was established as the result of an agreement with QIT Madagascar Minerals S.A or QMM SA that was signed on 22 April 2005; it opened in September of that year.  it had about 263 students. The Fort-Dauphin campus began its senior high classes in 2010, and the junior high ones were recognised by AEFE that year.

See also
 French people in Madagascar

References

External links
 Lycée La Clairefontaine Anantanarivo 
 Lycée La Clairefontaine Tôlanaro 

Antananarivo
Elementary and primary schools in Madagascar
French international schools in Madagascar
International high schools
1982 establishments in Madagascar
Educational institutions established in 1982
High schools and secondary schools in Madagascar